The Downtown Florence Historic District in Florence, Colorado was listed on the National Register of Historic Places in 2017.

A walking tour through the historic district includes the Florence Post Office where a WPA-era mural “Antelope Watering Hole” can be seen, and the McCandless Cabin, the oldest continually occupied house in Florence.

The district is roughly bounded by Main St., Santa Fe & Petroleum Aves. between W. 2nd & Railroad Sts.

The listing included 56 contributing buildings, 21 non-contributing ones, and a non-contributing structure.

References

National Register of Historic Places in Fremont County, Colorado
Historic districts on the National Register of Historic Places in Colorado